Gerald Forrest (born 21 January 1957) is an English retired footballer who played at full-back for Rotherham United and Southampton.

Football career
Born in Stockton-on-Tees, Forrest played his youth football with Billingham Town and was a member of the Stockton Youth Representative team in the mid-1970s.

He then joined South Bank of the Northern League from where he was invited to Rotherham United for a trial in February 1977. After making an impression on manager Jimmy McGuigan, Forrest was signed as a professional and went straight into Rotherham's first team at the start of the 1977–78 season, remaining an automatic choice for several years. In 1981, Rotherham were Third Division champions but after two seasons in the Second Division they dropped back down again.

Described as "an exceptionally skilful attacking right back", Forrest soon attracted attention from top clubs, with an offer of £200,000 from Sunderland being rejected. Eventually, Rotherham agreed to let him move on in December 1985 after Southampton of the First Division made an offer of £100,000, although Forrest was by now 28 years old.

At The Dell, Forrest soon justified manager Chris Nicholl's investment and made the step-up to top-flight football seamlessly. He was a cultured right back who was comfortable on the ball and strong in attack yet had great defensive abilities. He made his debut for "the Saints", when he took the place of Steve Baker in a 3–0 victory over Arsenal on 7 December 1985, retaining his place for the rest of the season.

Over the next three seasons, he rarely missed a game, until October 1988 when he was replaced by Ray Wallace in a 2–1 defeat by Sheffield Wednesday. Wallace's brothers Rod and Danny were established members of the Southampton side – this was the first time three brothers had played in the same team in the Football League First Division for 67 years.

Now in his early thirties, Forrest made only the occasional appearance until he sustained a serious knee injury against Wimbledon on 30 September 1989 which ended his career at Southampton. By the time that he had regained his fitness six months later, Jason Dodd was beginning to establish himself at right-back and with Aleksei Cherednik also on the books, Forrest was unable to get back into the team and was given a free transfer.

Forrest returned to Rotherham in August 1990 for one final season in League football before dropping down to the lower leagues with Gateshead United.

Coaching career
In 1992, Forrest joined the coaching staff at Darlington taking over the reins as caretaker manager in October 1993 (with Tim Parkin) when Billy McEwan was dismissed. Forrest and Parkin took charge of the first-team for four matches before Alan Murray took over permanently.

Career statistics

Honours
Rotherham United
Third Division champions: 1980–81

References

External links
 Profile and photograph on Sporting Heroes
 
 Saints Legends You Have Never Heard Of !: Gerry Forrest

1957 births
Living people
Footballers from Stockton-on-Tees
Footballers from County Durham
English footballers
Association football fullbacks
Rotherham United F.C. players
Southampton F.C. players
Billingham Town F.C. players
Gateshead F.C. players
Darlington F.C. managers
English football managers